The 2023 Kansas State Wildcats football team will represent Kansas State University in the Big 12 Conference during the 2023 NCAA Division I FBS football season. The Wildcats are expected to be led by Chris Klieman in his fifth year as their head coach.

They play their home games at Bill Snyder Family Football Stadium in Manhattan, Kansas.

Schedule

References

Kansas State
Kansas State Wildcats football seasons
Kansas State Wildcats football